Harriet Hinsdale was an American screenwriter, playwright, and author. She was on the writing staff at Warner Brothers for many years as a story editor, and was the author of several novels. She was noted for her theatrical collaborations with Orson Welles, and she often co-wrote projects with Ramon Romero.

Selected works 
Film

 Apache (1928)
 No Babies Wanted (1928)

Theater

 Crescendo! (1946)
 Robert Louis Stevenson (1944)
 The Missing Witness (1930)

Literature

 Born to Rope (1972)
 Confederate Gray (1963)
 Be My Love (1950)

References 

American women screenwriters
1883 births
1982 deaths
20th-century American women writers
20th-century American screenwriters